The Dhaka Platoon (Dhakaiya/), formerly known as the Dhaka Dynamites, is a franchise cricket team that plays in the Bangladesh Premier League (BPL), representing the country's Dhaka Division. Following the 2012 competition, the Platoon are one of the BPL's seven existing members. The team is headquartered at the Sher-e-Bangla Cricket Stadium in Mirpur, and so is one of three teams playing in the city, alongside the Dhaka Division cricket team and Dhaka Metropolis cricket team which are active in first-class cricket.

The 2019–20 season was the 7th season for the Bangladesh Premier League franchise Dhaka Platoon. They were one of the seven teams that competed in the 2019—20 Bangladesh Premier League. The franchise previously qualified for the BPL playoffs in 2015 and 2017 and won the tournament in 2012, 2013 and 2016.

The ownership of the team was acquired by Ahmed Shayan Fazlur Rahman's Beximco Group. The league was later replaced with Bangladesh Premier League, with the ownership of the franchise being awarded to Europa Group under the name of Dhaka Gladiators for US$5.05 million. After multiple corruption charges against the owners, the team was re-acquired by Beximco Group in 2015. Later in 2019 Jamuna Bank acquired the team's sponsorship, with Gazi Golam Murtoza as the team director.

Squad 

 Players with international caps are listed in bold.
  denotes a player who is currently unavailable for selection.
  denotes a player who is unavailable for rest of the season

Season summary 
The franchise had signed English ODI captain Eoin Morgan who is the winning captain of ICC Cricket World Cup 2019 and South African explosive batsman David Miller as their two direct signings. For the 2019 edition of the BPL, the Platoon were coached by Mohammad Salahuddin and captained by Mashrafe Mortaza.

Dhaka Platoon started off their 2019–20 Bangladesh Premier League campaign disappointingly by losing in a big margin of 9 wickets in the third match of the tournament against Rajshahi Royals. In their next game, they defeated Cumilla Warriors by 20 runs. Though they didn't start well in that match, having a wicket fallen in the very first ball, they could totally secure 180 runs from 20 overs. This was largely due to Tamim Iqbal's 75 runs off 53 runs and Thisara Perera's smashing 42 runs off just 17 balls. In response, the Warriors were restricted to 160 for 9 as Thisara Perera picked up 5 wickets for 30 runs and named as the Player of the Match.

The first phase of the tournament in Dhaka ended with Platoon's 24 runs win over Sylhet Thunder. Platoon finished their first innings scoring 182 runs losing 4 wickets, with Anamul Haque as the top-scorer, who smashed 62 runs off 42 balls. Batting second, Thunder started to lose wickets regularly as Hasan Mahmud was Platoon's best bowler taking 2 wickets for 24 runs. In their next match, Platoon lost against Chattogram Challengers by 16 runs while chasing 221 making it a high aggregate match.

In the Platoon's fifth game of the season, despite Bhanuka Rajapaksa's unbeaten 95, they clinched a five-wicket victory over Cumilla Warriors. Mahedi Hasan stars in the successful chase as he made 59 runs off 29 balls along with picking up economic 2 wickets for just 9 runs. In their following game, they made their highest successful chase in the season, chasing 175 runs by losing 2 wickets. Relying on Tamim Iqbal's 60 off 49 and Mahedi Hasan's speedy 56 off 28, Platoon comfortably won the match with 9 balls remaining.

The following match, Wahab Riaz’s fiery fifer inspired Platoon to their fifth win in the league and up to third place in the table as they thumped Rajshahi Royals by 74 runs. Asif Ali's smashing 39 runs off just 13 balls in the late overs and Hasan Mahmud's four wicket haul led Platoon to thrillingly win over Khulna Tigers by 12 runs in their next match.

Dhaka Platoon beat Rangpur Rangers by 61 runs in the next match, bowling out the Rangers for just 84 and thus confirmed a playoff berth. In their last two matches of the league stage, Platoon lost against Rangpur Rangers and Khulna Tigers by 11 runs and 8 wickets respectively, although they were qualified to the playoffs.

At the playoffs stage, Dhaka Platoon lost the eliminator against Chattogram Challengers by 7 wickets and thus they were eliminated from the tournament.

Kit manufacturers and sponsors

Administration and support stuff

Season standings 

 
  advanced to the Qualifier 1
  advanced to the Eliminator

Matches

Statistics

Most Runs

Most Wickets

Awards and achievements

References 

2019–20 Bangladesh Premier League
Dhaka Platoon
Dhaka Platoon seasons